see also Smarties (disambiguation)

Smarty, known in the United Kingdom as Hit Me Again, is a 1934 American Pre-Code comedy film directed by Robert Florey and starring Warren William and Joan Blondell. It was adapted from F. Hugh Herbert's play by Carl Erickson (writer).

The film's title refers to Blondell's character, happily married but with a habit of provocative teasing. One evening her teasing leads to a slap on the face from her husband. For this she engages her husband's friend and attorney Vernon (Horton) to divorce him, marries Vernon, then begins to verbally tease him as well, wearing revealing clothes, and inviting her ex-husband over for dinner.

Cast
 Joan Blondell as Vicki Wallace Thorpe
 Warren William as Tony Wallace
 Edward Everett Horton as Vernon Thorpe
 Frank McHugh as George Lancaster
 Claire Dodd as Nita
 Joan Wheeler as Mrs. Bonnie Durham
 Virginia Sale as Vicki's Maid
 Leonard Carey as Tony's Butler

External links

1934 films
1934 comedy films
American black-and-white films
American comedy films
Comedy of remarriage films
1930s English-language films
American films based on plays
Films directed by Robert Florey
Warner Bros. films
Films with screenplays by F. Hugh Herbert
1930s American films